John Richardson Thurman (October 6, 1814 – July 24, 1854) was a U.S. Representative from New York.

Born in New York City, Thurman graduated from Columbia University in 1835. He moved to Chestertown, Warren County and engaged in agricultural pursuits. He was also involved in several businesses, including serving as a Director of the Sacket's Harbor and Saratoga Railroad. He also speculated in land, as evidenced by the fact that his widow and children sold some of their holdings to the Delaware and Hudson Railroad during its construction.

He held several local offices, including Associate Judge of the Warren County Court.

Thurman was elected as a Whig to the Thirty-first Congress (March 4, 1849 – March 3, 1851). He declined to be a candidate for renomination in 1850. After leaving Congress Thurman returned to managing his farm and other interests.

He died at his home near Friends Lake in Chestertown on July 24, 1854. He was originally interred in the family cemetery, before being reinterred in Oakwood Cemetery, Troy, New York.

References

Sources

1814 births
1854 deaths
People from Warren County, New York
Columbia University alumni
19th-century American railroad executives
Delaware and Hudson Railway
New York (state) state court judges
Whig Party members of the United States House of Representatives from New York (state)
19th-century American politicians
Burials at Oakwood Cemetery (Troy, New York)
19th-century American judges